The 2013 Finlandia Trophy is a senior international figure skating competition in the 2013–14 season. The 18th edition of the annual event was held on October 4–6, 2013 at the Barona Arena in Espoo. Medals were awarded in the disciplines of men's singles, ladies' singles, ice dancing, and synchronized skating.

Entries

† Withdrew:
 Korpi due to foot injury
 Bobrova/Soloviev due to Soloviev's ankle sprain.

Results

Men

Ladies

Ice dancing

Synchronized skating

References

External links
 2013 Finlandia Trophy results
 Finlandia Trophy at the Finnish Figure Skating Association

2013
Finlandia Trophy
Finlandia Trophy